A by-election was held for the New South Wales Legislative Assembly electorate of Cumberland South Riding on 17 October 1856 because William Manning was appointed Attorney-General in the Parker ministry.

Dates

Result

The by-election was caused by the appointment of William Manning as Attorney-General in the Parker ministry.

See also
Electoral results for the district of Cumberland (South Riding)
List of New South Wales state by-elections

References

1856 elections in Australia
New South Wales state by-elections
1850s in New South Wales